The 1992 NCAA Division I-AA football rankings are from the NCAA Division I-AA football committee, which in the 1992 season was composed of four components.  One of these components was the Sports Network poll of 49 Division I-AA head coaches, athletic directors, sports information directors and media members, which was sometimes published separately.

Legend

NCAA Division I-AA Football Committee poll
Currently, the following polls are only ones available.  A preseason poll was also released.

References

Rankings
NCAA Division I FCS football rankings